George Spero (29 November 1941 – 8 December 2022) was an Australian rules footballer who played with Essendon in the Victorian Football League (VFL). He suffered a serious knee injury in his only senior VFL season and a year later he returned to his old club, Keilor.  Spent six more seasons with Keilor before finishing his career with Tooberac.

Notes

External links 
		

Essendon Football Club past player profile

1941 births
2022 deaths
Australian rules footballers from Victoria (Australia)
Essendon Football Club players
Keilor Football Club players